Dinakaran is a Tamil daily newspaper distributed in Tamil Nadu, India. It was founded by K. P. Kandasamy in 1977 and is currently owned by media conglomerate Sun Group's- Sun Network.Dinakaran is the second largest circulated Tamil daily in India after Dina Thanthi. It is printed in 12 cities across India. 
Dinakaran was founded in 1977 by K. P. Kandasamy after he split from Dina Thanthi owned by his father-in-law S. P. Adithanar during the split of All India Anna Dravida Munnetra Kazhagam from  Dravida Munnetra Kazhagam. In 2005, the newspaper was acquired from K. P. K. Kumaran by Kalanithi Maran's Sun Group.

Dinakaran is published from 12 cities in India namely Bengaluru, Chennai, Coimbatore, Madurai, Mumbai, New Delhi, Nagercoil, Puducherry, Salem, Tiruchirappalli, Tirunelveli and Vellore. As of 2014, the newspaper has a circulation of 1,215,583.

References

Tamil-language newspapers published in India
Companies based in Chennai
Mass media in Bangalore
Mass media in Chennai
Mass media in Coimbatore
Mass media in Madurai
Mass media in Puducherry
Newspapers published in Tiruchirappalli
Newspapers established in 1977
1977 establishments in Karnataka
Sun Group